This might be a list of wars involving New Zealand. New Zealand has participated in many armed conflicts, usually alongside its ally the United Kingdom and never as the main belligerent.

List

Colonial New Zealand (1841–1907)

New Zealand (1907–Present)

See also

 Military history of New Zealand

References

 
New Zealand
Wars
Wars